Jack Russell may refer to:

Jack Russell Terrier, a type of dog

People 
Jack Russell (American football) (1919–2006), American football end
Jack Russell (baseball) (1905–1990), American baseball player
Jack Russell (cricketer, born 1963) (born 1963), English cricketer and artist
Jack Russell (cricketer, born 1887) (1887–1961), English cricketer
Jack Russell (footballer) (1904–1995), English footballer in the 1920s and 1930s
Jack Russell (Cork hurler) (born 1945), Irish hurler and coach
Jack Russell (Wexford hurler) (born 1950), Irish hurler
Jack Russell (musician) (born 1960), American lead singer for the band Great White
Jack Russell (priest) (1795–1883), English dog breeder and hunter
Jack Russell (rower) (born 1930), Canadian who competed in rowing at the 1952 Summer Olympics
Jack Russell, 25th Baron de Clifford (1884–1909), British army officer and nobleman

Fictional characters
Jack Russell, one of the alter egos of Werewolf by Night in Marvel Comics

See also
Jack Russell Memorial Stadium, a stadium in Clearwater, Florida
John Russell (disambiguation)